Amphibian antimicrobial peptides are a family of highly potent antimicrobial peptides with a large spectrum of activity, which are synthesized by vertebrates as an efficient host-defence mechanism against invading microorganisms. A number of these defence peptides are secreted from the skin of frogs and other amphibians, including the opiate-like dermorphins and deltorphins, and antimicrobial dermaseptins, temporins, bombinins, magainin, pseudin, bombesins, and maculatins.

References

Antimicrobial peptides
Protein families